The Government of the 10th Dáil or the 2nd Government of Ireland (30 June 1938 – 1 July 1943) was the government of Ireland formed after the 1938 general election held on 17 June. It was a single-party Fianna Fáil government led by Éamon de Valera as Taoiseach. Fianna Fáil had been in office since the 1932 general election.

The 2nd Government lasted for  days.

2nd Government of Ireland

Nomination of Taoiseach
The members of the 10th Dáil first met on 30 June 1938. In the debate on the nomination of Taoiseach, Fianna Fáil leader and outgoing Taoiseach Éamon de Valera was proposed. The motion was approved by 75 to 45. De Valera was appointed as Taoiseach by President Douglas Hyde. This was just five days after the inauguration of Hyde as the first President of Ireland on 25 June.

Members of the Government
After his appointment as Taoiseach by the president, Éamon de Valera proposed the members of the government and they were approved by the Dáil. They were appointed to office by the president.

Parliamentary Secretaries
On 30 June 1938, the Government appointed Parliamentary Secretaries on the nomination of the Taoiseach.

Constitutional amendments
During the first three years of the term of office of the first President of Ireland, the Oireachtas could pass amendments to the Constitution of Ireland without a referendum. This period lasted from 25 June 1938 to 24 June 1941. The First Amendment of the Constitution of Ireland was introduced and signed into law on 2 September 1939, allowing the Oireachtas to resolve that a state of emergency exists when an armed conflict exists outside of the state. The Emergency was declared on the same day, and the emergency powers lapsed on 2 September 1946. The Second Amendment of the Constitution of Ireland was signed into law on 30 May 1941 and was an omnibus amendment with 40 separate changes across the text of the Constitution. Both amendments were proposed by the Taoiseach.

See also
Dáil Éireann
Politics of the Republic of Ireland

References

Governments of Ireland
1938 establishments in Ireland
1943 disestablishments in Ireland
Cabinets established in 1938
Cabinets disestablished in 1943
10th Dáil